Argenis Tortolero (16 March 1941 – 3 August 2011) was a Venezuelan footballer. He played in five matches for the Venezuela national football team in 1967. He was also part of Venezuela's squad for the 1967 South American Championship.

References

1941 births
2011 deaths
Venezuelan footballers
Venezuela international footballers
Place of birth missing
Association football midfielders
Asociación Civil Deportivo Lara players